Chersotis poliogramma is a moth of the family Noctuidae. It is found in Kashmir.

Noctuinae
Moths of Asia